The Nevada System of Higher Education (NSHE, formerly the University and Community College System of Nevada or "UCCSN") is a state government unit in Nevada that oversees its public system of colleges and universities. It was formed in 1968 to oversee all state-supported higher education in the state. Two doctoral-granting research universities, one state college, four community colleges and one research institute comprise the land grant system. About 105,000 students attend the degree-granting campuses.

Schools

Four-year
 Great Basin College, previously known as Northern Nevada College, is a four-year public college serving northeastern Nevada.
 Nevada State College, founded in 2002, is Nevada's newest four-year public college.
 University of Nevada, Las Vegas was the second four-year university in the state to be founded, initially as Nevada Southern University in 1957. Winning its autonomy in 1965, Nevada Southern was renamed  in 1969 due to the need for better national recognition and partially for separation from the University of Nevada. UNLV is classified by the Carnegie Classification of Institutions of Higher Learning as an R1 - Very high research activity university.
 University of Nevada, Reno is the oldest University in the state, established in 1874 as a land-grant institution. It is the flagship institution of the state and known as the University of Nevada. It is one of two Tier 1 universities in Nevada.

Two-year
 College of Southern Nevada, founded in 1971 as Clark County Community College and later renamed the Community College of Southern Nevada before gaining its current name, is the largest institution of higher education, public or private, in Nevada.  It is also the third-largest community college in the United States.
 Truckee Meadows Community College is a community college serving residents of Reno and the surrounding area.
 Western Nevada College, previously known as Western Nevada Community College, is a community college serving northwestern Nevada.

Graduate-only
 Desert Research Institute is a research institution primarily focusing on environmental sciences; many UNLV and UNR MS and PhD students are advised by Desert Research Institute faculty.

References

External links
 Official website

 
1968 establishments in Nevada
N